Tom Jones "Black Tom" Parry Jr. (January 24, 1923 – November 21, 2017) was an American football coach. He was the head football coach at Central Washington University in Ellensburg, Washington, from 1966 to 1982 and 1984 to 1986.

Early years
Parry was born in Seattle in 1923. He attended Queen Anne High School, graduating in 1941. He attended Washington State College (now known as Washington State University) where he was a lineman for the Washington State Cougars football team in 1942, 1946, and 1947. His college career was interrupted by service in the United States Navy during World War II. He was co-captain of the 1947 Washington State Cougars football team. He received a degree in physical education from Washington State in 1949.

Coaching career
Parry began his coaching career at Langley High School on Whidbey Island in 1949. He then coached at Clarkston High School in Clarkston, Washington from 1950 to 1955.

Parry was the head football coach at Wenatchee Valley College in Wenatchee, Washington from 1956 to 1957 and again from 1961 to 1965, compiling a record of 30-22-3. He also held assistant coaching positions at the University of Montana in 1958 and at Washington State in 1959 and 1960.

Parry was hired as the head football coach at Central Washington University in March 1966. He served in that role from 1966 to 1982 and 1984 to 1986, compiling a career college football coaching record of 95–91–4. He won the NAIA District 1 Coach of the Year award five times, and his teams won six conference championships. He resigned as Central Washington's head coach at the end of the 1986 season.

Parry left Central Washington for one year in 1983 to serve as an assistant coach of the Los Angeles Express of the United States Football League (USFL).

After retiring from Central Washington, he returned to head coaching at Yakima Valley College in 1989. He also served as an assistant coach briefly at Washington State.

Later years
Parry died in 2017 in Yakima, Washington, at age 94.

Head coaching record

College

Notes

References

1923 births
2017 deaths
Central Washington Wildcats football coaches
Montana Grizzlies football coaches
United States Football League coaches
Washington State Cougars football coaches
Washington State Cougars football players
High school football coaches in Washington (state)
Junior college football coaches in the United States
United States Navy personnel of World War II
Players of American football from Seattle
Coaches of American football from Washington (state)
Military personnel from Washington (state)